Justin Alastair Nel (born 14 February 1987) is a Namibian rugby union player for the Namibia national team and the  in the Currie Cup and the Rugby Challenge. His regular position is fullback.

Rugby career

Nel was born in Windhoek (then in South-West Africa, but part of modern-day Namibia). He played rugby sevens for Namibia, representing them at the 2010 South Africa Sevens.

References

External links
 

1987 births
Living people
Namibia international rugby union players
Namibian rugby union players
Rugby union fullbacks
Rugby union players from Windhoek